Sean McCourt (born January 19, 1971) is an American actor, born in Detroit. His Broadway credits include Wicked, Titanic, It Ain't Nothin' But the Blues, Women on the Verge of a Nervous Breakdown, and Mary Poppins.

Career

He is the narrator and Executive Producer of Barnwood Builders on DIY Network.

McCourt played  the drunk, psychopathic Dr. Thomas Parker in the original cast of the Off-Broadway musical Batboy: The Musical! , in 2001, appearing with Deven May, Kaitlin Hopkins, And Kerry Butler.

Wicked

McCourt starred in the original Broadway cast of Wicked, which opened on October 30, 2003, as the Witch's Father and the Ozian Official. He also served as an understudy for The Wizard and Doctor Dillamond. After previews from October 8, 2003, the show opened October 30 at the Gershwin Theatre. He replaced Joel Gray as the Wizard in 2004.  On July 26, 2005, he replaced William Youmans in the lead role of Doctor Dillamond and departed the company on August 6, 2006 after almost three years with the show.

He is the co-creator of Behind the Emerald Curtain - a behind-the-scenes tour of Wicked.

McCourt returned to Wicked for a brief stint in February/March 2012. He reprised his roles as the Witch's Father and the Ozian Official, as well as returning to understudy the Wizard and Doctor Dillamond, covering for vacationing cast member Michael DeVries. He returned to play the same track briefly in May 2013, covering DeVries' holiday once again.

Television

On television, McCourt appeared in All My Children, Ed, Sesame Street, and several episodes of Law and Order .
Around 2010, McCourt began producing television. He has produced and directed Garbage Moguls on NatGeo, The Bait, on Discovery, and 5  seasons of Barnwood Builders on DIY Network.

Personal life
McCourt and his wife Beth Thompson live in South Orange, New Jersey with their two daughters Clara  and Charlotte (as of 2006).

References

External links
 Internet Movie Database
 Internet Broadway Database

American male musical theatre actors
Living people
Male actors from Detroit
People from South Orange, New Jersey
1971 births